Nicolas Escudé and Fabrice Santoro were the defending champions but only Santoro competed that year with Michaël Llodra.

Llodra and Santoro lost in the final 6–3, 1–6, 6–3 against Wayne Arthurs and Paul Hanley.

Seeds
Champion seeds are indicated in bold text while text in italics indicates the round in which those seeds were eliminated.

 Bob Bryan /  Mike Bryan (first round)
 Jonas Björkman /  Todd Woodbridge (semifinals)
 Mark Knowles /  Daniel Nestor (semifinals)
 Michaël Llodra /  Fabrice Santoro (final)

Draw

External links
 2003 BNP Paribas Masters Doubles Draw

2003 BNP Paribas Masters
Doubles